Natural Enemies is a 1979 American drama film directed by Jeff Kanew based on the 1975 novel Natural Enemies written by Julius Horwitz. The film stars Hal Holbrook and Louise Fletcher as a married couple whose relationship is strained and threatened by the husband's interest in getting rid of his wife, including resorting to murder. The man, Paul (Hal Holbrook) ultimately hires five hookers to fulfill a final fantasy before killing himself and his family.

Summary
Paul Steward is a 48 year old magazine editor who in his words wishes he could rewrite his life. As the film opens he is standing by his bed in his isolated Connecticut farmhouse after a sleepless night as his alarm clock ticks saying that this is the day he will take a rifle and kill his wife, three children and then himself. In his narration, Steward professes that all men for various reasons have thought about killing their families. He mentions that he and his wife Miriam have not slept together in eight months. Miriam has attempted suicide and has a history of instability having had shock treatments. As she drives him to the train station, Steward laments that there is no longer tenderness between them and that they are only married because of the children. Steward meets a former astronaut at work who wants to write an article for him. As he interviews the man, Steward is intrigued by his description of loneliness on the moon and feels the connection to his own inner torment. Steward talks to a friend at the office about men who kill their families and what it means. His friend is a Holocaust survivor who is frustrated that so many have forgotten the horrors of Nazi Germany. Steward hires five hookers to service him in a final act of indulgence on his last day. He shares memories with them of his and Miriam's life together, and of their failing relationship. In the film's shocking conclusion a radio voiceover reveals that Paul indeed followed through with his murder-suicide scenario.

Cast 
 Hal Holbrook as Paul Steward
 Louise Fletcher as Miriam Steward
 Peter Armstrong as Tony Steward
 Elizabeth Berridge as Sheila Steward
 Steve Austin as Alex Steward (Credited as Stephen Austin)
 Jim Pappas as Fred Russo
 Ellen Barber as Anne
 John Bartholomew as Arthur Eaton
 Charles Randall as Doctor
 José Ferrer as Harry Rosenthal (Credited as José Ferrer)
 Lisa Carroll as The Madam
 June Berry as Girl in Brothel
 Alisha Fontaine as Girl in Brothel
 Patricia Mauceri as Girl in Brothel
 Michele O'Brien as Girl in Brothel
 Claire Reilly as Girl in Brothel
 Viveca Lindfors as Dr. Baker
 Frank Bongiorno as Taxi Driver
 Harry Daley as Conductor
 Patricia Elliott as Woman on Train
 Robert Perry as Newscaster
 Casey Kanew as The Dog

Reception
Film historian Leonard Maltin gave the picture 1.5 out of a possible 4 stars; he denounced the movie as "Cold and uninvolving, not to mention strange..." Screenwriting instructor Irwin Blacker seemed to agree, calling the film "...a total failure, despite good performances and direction, since the Holbrook character fails to make any moral decision; rather than confronting and resolving the issues behind his discontent, he evades them."

References

External links

Movie Review w/ Screenshots and Clip

1979 films
1979 drama films
American drama films
Films directed by Jeff Kanew
Films scored by Don Ellis
1970s English-language films
1970s American films